James P. Purdy is an American scholar of writing and rhetoric. He is an associate professor at Duquesne University and director of its writing center, and serves on the editorial board of Computers and Composition: An International Journal  and Writing Spaces. His focus is on writing, publishing, and literacy in the digital age.

Purdy received his BA in English from Pennsylvania State University (2000) and his MA and PhD in English/Writing Studies from University of Illinois at Urbana-Champaign (2001, 2006). He has authored and co-authored articles on writing, pedagogy, and Wikipedia, is the co-author of The Effects of Intellectual Property Law in Writing Studies: Ethics, Sponsors, and Academic Knowledge-Making, and is the co-editor of four collections on digital scholarship.

Edited collections
The New Digital Scholar: Exploring and Enriching the Research and Writing Practices of NextGen Students (with Randall McClure). Medford, NJ: Information Today, 2013. .
The Next Digital Scholar: A Fresh Approach to the Common Core State Standards in Research and Writing (with Randall McClure). Medford, NJ: Information Today, 2014. .
The Future Scholar: Researching and Teaching the Frameworks for Writing and Information Literacy (with Randall McClure). Medford, NJ: Information Today, 2016. .
Making Space: Writing Instruction, Infrastructure, and Multiliteracies (with Dànielle Nicole DeVoss). Ann Arbor, MI: University of Michigan Press, 2017. https://dx.doi.org/10.3998/mpub.7820727.

References

External links
James Purdy at Duquesne
Wikipedia is Good For You?

Living people
American humanities academics
American mass media scholars
Duquesne University faculty
Pennsylvania State University alumni
University of Illinois Urbana-Champaign alumni
Year of birth missing (living people)